Exaeretia mongolicella is a moth of the family Depressariidae. It is found in Poland, Lithuania and Russia (Siberia, the Russian Far East and Transbaikalia).

The length of the forewings is 9–10 mm.

References

Moths described in 1882
Exaeretia
Moths of Europe
Moths of Asia